Great Britain, or in full Great Britain and Northern Ireland, the team of the British Olympic Association (BOA), which represents the United Kingdom, competed at the 2020 Summer Olympics in Tokyo. Originally scheduled to take place from 24 July to 9 August 2020, the Games were postponed to 23 July to 8 August 2021, because of the COVID-19 pandemic.

British athletes have appeared in every Summer Olympic Games of the modern era, alongside those of Australia, France, Greece, and Switzerland, although Great Britain is the only team to have won at least one gold medal at all of them. This streak was maintained in Tokyo when Adam Peaty successfully defended his 100 metre breaststroke title on the third morning of the Games.

The first medals of the Games for Great Britain were won by martial artists with taekwondo-ka Bradly Sinden guaranteeing Team GB at least a silver medal by qualifying for the final of the −68 kg event in taekwondo. Before the final took place, however, judoka Chelsie Giles secured a bronze medal in the 52 kg class via the repechage.

Summary

The 2020 Games saw members of the Great Britain team achieve a number of prominent milestones. In the pool, Adam Peaty became the first British swimmer to successfully defend an Olympic gold medal, winning the 100 metre breaststroke for the second time. The British swimming team also had its most successful Olympics in history winning eight medals (with four golds) eclipsing the previous Olympic swimming best of seven medals (which also included four golds) which had stood since the London 1908 Games (113 years). This included a 1–2 finish in the final of the Men's 200m freestyle for Duncan Scott (who took silver) and Tom Dean (who took gold) which was the first time British swimmers had achieved this in any Olympic swimming event since 1908. Scott also became Britain's most successful athlete in any sport at a single games in terms of number of medals won with four medals in total made up of one gold and three silver medals. However, Adam Peaty, James Guy and Tom Dean were more successful in terms of gold medals winning two golds to Scott's single gold. By winning gold alongside James Guy and Adam Peaty in the mixed 4x100 metres medley relay Freya Anderson, Kathleen Dawson and Anna Hopkin became the first British female swimmers since Rebecca Adlington took double individual gold in the 400 metre freestyle and 800m freestyle events  at the Beijing 2008 games to win an Olympic gold medal. However, no British female swimmer won a medal in any of the individual women's events making the medals from mixed medley the only ones won by British female swimmers at the Games.

On 4 August Sky Brown became the youngest British Olympian ever to win a medal when she won bronze in the Women's Park Skateboarding at the age of 13 years and 28 days.

Gymnast Max Whitlock also clinched his second consecutive Olympic title on the pommel horse becoming one of the most successful gymnasts ever in the history of that specific apparatus – having also won three World Championship titles in the discipline – and the fourth man in Olympic history to successfully defend their pommel horse title. In doing do he cemented his position as Great Britain's most successful Olympic gymnast with six medals overall including three golds. Bryony Page in the Women's Trampoline competition claimed her second consecutive Olympic medal in the event with a bronze medal having won a silver in Rio. A team containing  Jennifer Gadirova, Jessica Gadirova, Alice Kinsella and Amelie Morgan also won a Bronze in the Women's Team  Artistic All-Round event. giving the gymnastics squad three medals at Tokyo 2020 overall down from the seven achieved by gymnastics in Rio in 2016.

Keely Hodgkinson and Laura Muir secured  silver medals in the Women's 800 metres and 1500 metres respectively. These were the first medals in either of these events for a British athlete since Kelly Holmes won double gold at the Athens 2004 Games. Josh Kerr by winning bronze in the Men's 1500m also became the first British athlete to win an Olympic medal in that event since Seoul 1988 where Peter Elliott won a silver medal.  Holly Bradshaw also won her first medal in either Olympic or outdoor World Championship competition  with bronze in the women's pole vault. The women's 4x100 relay squad also won a bronze.

Despite failing to medal in the men's match sprint Jason Kenny took sole ownership of the record as Great Britain's most successful Olympian, most decorated Olympian and the most successful and most decorated Olympic cyclist of any nation, with silver in the men's team sprint and gold in the men's keirin. This was the fourth consecutive keirin title for Great Britain, and took Kenny's career tally to seven gold and two silver medals and was the fourth consecutive Olympics in which he had won one or more golds. His wife Laura Kenny lost her omnium title after a major crash in the opening scratch race, and only managed a silver medal in the women's team pursuit. However, in the inaugural Olympic women's Madison she and partner Katie Archibald won the event, gaining a lap and winning all but two of the intermediate sprints. This took her career tally to five golds and one silver making her the most decorated British female Olympian, and the most successful and most decorated female Olympic cyclist of any nation. Together the Kennys also became the most successful married Olympians in history where both partners have won a gold medal. Britain's other track cycling gold came courtesy of Matt Walls in the men's omnium- the first time a male British Olympic cyclist has won the Olympic title in that event. Walls also won a silver medal alongside Ethan Hayter in the men's Madison event.
 
On the waves, Giles Scott secured Great Britain's sixth consecutive gold medal in sailing's Finn class which was making its final Olympic appearance, while Hannah Mills became Great Britain's most successful female Olympic sailor defending her Women's 470 title with Eilidh McIntyre having won the same class with Saskia Clark in 2016. McIntyre was emulating her father Michael who had won gold in the Star class alongside Bryn Vaile at the 1988 Games in Seoul.

On a less positive note a number of iconic 'streaks' of British success were broken. The men's team pursuit title left British hands for the first time since 2004, as did the men's team sprint with both Ed Clancy and Jason Kenny denied fourth consecutive gold medals in the same event. The men's match sprint in cycling also left British hands for the first time since 2004, although Jack Carlin won a bronze medal. The men's coxless four lost the Olympic title for the first time since 1996, while the rowing team won no gold medals for the first time since 1980 winning only 2 medals in total across the whole Olympic rowing regatta.

Despite winning five medals in total, these Olympics the first time since 1996 that Great Britain's athletics team failed to win a gold medal. This was partly due to unfortunate injuries to world champions Dina Asher-Smith (200 metres) and Katarina Johnson-Thompson (Heptathlon) who were seen as Britain's best medal hopes in the athletics events. The men's 4 × 100 metres relay squad were also pipped to gold by Italy by 0.01 seconds on the finish line having been leading going into the anchor leg. However, it subsequently emerged the British quartet  could lose their silver medals after a member of the quartet CJ Ujah was revealed on 12 August 2021 to have failed a drugs test with Ujah provisionally suspended by the Athletics Integrity Unit following the games pending further investigation . The matter was referred to the Court of Arbitration For Sport Anti-Doping Division to decide if the British 4x100 male quartet should be disqualified from the final results. On 18 February 2022, it was confirmed the British Mens 4x 100 metres athletics relay quartet would be stripped of their silver medals meaning Great Britains final medal tally from the game is 64 - one less than achieved at the London 2012 Olympics.

A number of  British defending champions from 2016 (including some 'double' champions who won gold medals in 2012 and 2016) either were not selected, or were unable to retain their titles, including Mo Farah, Alistair Brownlee, Jade Jones, Charlotte Dujardin and Andy Murray. In comparison, three former world champions, but long time 'nearly men' on the Olympic stage finally reached the top step of the rostrum, Jonathan Brownlee winning the inaugural triathlon mixed relay, James Guy in both the men's 4 × 200 metre freestyle relay and the mixed medley relay, and Tom Daley, winning gold in the men's 10 metre synchro with debutant Matty Lee, before his bronze in the individual event made him the first British diver to win four career Olympic medals.

Great Britain had some notable success in new sports and events, winning the inaugural gold medals for women's BMX freestyle, mixed 4 x 100 metre medley  swimming relay (in a new world record), women's madison and the triathlon mixed team relay, and medals in men's BMX freestyle, women's skateboarding and women's featherweight boxing. The women's +87 kg weightlifting event was technically a new event, but was in reality simply an adjusted version of the existing heavyweight event. Nonetheless, Emily Campbell's silver medal was the first ever won in weightlifting by a British woman, the first British weightlifting medal for either sex since 1984 and the first at a non-boycotted Games since Louis Martin medalled in consecutive Olympics in 1960 and 1964. Indeed, the weightlifting event at the Games was a significant success for Great Britain, with top-seven finishes for all four selected lifters, and Sarah Davies coming agonisingly close to winning a second silver medal in the −64 kg class.

Great Britain also had great success in both of the men's and women's modern pentathlon events with Kate French taking gold in the women's event, while Joseph Choong became the first British male modern pentathlete to win an individual medal when taking gold in the men's event. The victories of French and Choong marked the first time since the introduction of the women's event in 2000 that a 'double' had been achieved, with the same nation winning both events.

Medallists

| width="78%" align="left" valign="top" |

| width="22%" align="left" valign="top" |

Multiple medallists
The following Team GB competitors won multiple medals at the 2020 Olympic Games.

Charlotte Dujardin's two bronze medals added to her two golds from London 2012 and her gold and silver from Rio 2016 made her the first female British athlete to win six Olympic medals, a feat later equalled by Laura Kenny. Dujardin also became the first female British athlete to win multiple medals at three consecutive Games (two in London, two in Rio and two in Tokyo), a feat which was again equalled by Kenny. Two medals for Jason Kenny made him the first British athlete of either sex to win multiple medals at four successive games (2 in 2008, 2 in 2012, 3 in 2016 and 2 in 2020), a feat also unequalled by anyone in the Olympic sport of cycling. With silver in the Men's 4 × 100 m medley relay, Duncan Scott becomes the first British Olympian to win four medals in a single Games.

Administration
On 9 April 2018, the British Olympic Association announced that Mark England would be their Chef de Mission in Tokyo following his success in this role at Rio 2016. Under his leadership Team GB had become the first nation to increase its medal haul at the summer games after acting as host at London 2012.

Medal targets
On 9 July 2021, UK Sport announced they had set a medal target of 45–70 medals for the team. No individual targets have been set for each sport as it was considered impossible to properly evaluate the position of each sport in the context of the coronavirus pandemic, and the large scale disruption to both training and sports events that entailed.

Competitors
The team included nine sets of siblings: Tom and Emily Ford (Rowing), Jennifer and Jessica Gadirova (Gymnastics), Charlotte and Mathilda Hodgkins-Byrne (Rowing), Joe and Max Litchfield (Swimming), Luke and Pat McCormack (Boxing),  Andy and Jamie Murray (Tennis), Tiffany Porter and Cindy Sember (Athletics), Hannah and Jodie Williams (Athletics), and Adam and Simon Yates (Cycling). The Gadirovas, McCormacks and Yateses are all twins. In addition, Hannah Martin was a member of the women's hockey team while her brother Harry Martin, a two time Olympian, was a travelling reserve for the men's team. There was also one married couple in multi gold medallists: Jason and Laura Kenny (Cycling).

Dressage rider Carl Hester was competing at his sixth Olympic Games. Only fellow equestrian rider Nick Skelton has represented Great Britain at more Games with seven appearances. Meanwhile, archer Naomi Folkard was making her fifth consecutive appearance. Among British female athletes only six time Olympians Tessa Sanderson and Alison Williamson have competed at more Games.

In addition to the 376 strong British delegation Team GB confirmed the selection of 22 travelling reserves for various sports. These included the reserves for football, hockey and rugby 7s. On 3 July 2021, the IOC, having consulted with the individual federations of these three sports together with those of handball and water polo, announced that each team would be able to select their teams from both the original squads and the travelling reserves without the need to permanently replace one individual with another. This effectively increased the size of the squads from 18 to 22 for football, 16 to 18 for hockey and 12 to 13 for rugby 7s.

Archery

British archers qualified each for the men's and women's events by reaching the quarterfinal stage of their respective team recurves at the 2019 World Archery Championships in 's-Hertogenbosch, Netherlands. The rules of qualification also stipulate that a nation that qualifies at least one male and one female archer, as Great Britain have done, is automatically entered in the mixed team event. On 21 April 2021, Team GB announced the selection of the six archers who will represent the team in Tokyo.

Men

Women

Mixed

Artistic swimming

Great Britain qualified two athletes to the artistic swimming duet competition as a result of Spain's success in the final Artistic Swimming Olympic Team Qualification competition event on 11 June 2021. Spain's elevation to the team event freed a quota place in the 2019 European Champions Cup competition inherited by Great Britain. This slot was then superseded by the top seven finish achieved by Great Britain itself at the final FINA Artistic Swimming Olympic Qualification Tournament. On 22 June 2021, Team GB announced the selection of Kate Shortman and Isabelle Thorpe for Tokyo.

Athletics

British athletes achieved the entry standards, either by qualifying time or by world ranking, in several track and field events (up to a maximum of 3 athletes in each event): The team will be selected based on the results of the 2021 British Athletics Championships ( 25 to 27 June) to be held in Manchester, England. Relay qualification is achieved by a top eight finish at the 2019 World Athletics Championships in a relay event, or a top eight ranking in that event not including previously qualified nations. The first confirmed place was therefore assured when Great Britain finished fourth in the mixed 4 × 400 metres relay event at the Worlds in Doha. Great Britain secured top eight finishes, and therefore Olympic qualification, in the other four relay events in Doha on 5 and 6 October – along with the United States, they were the only teams to gain Olympic places in all five relay events at Doha.

In December 2019, UK Athletics confirmed the preselection of Callum Hawkins for the men's marathon. On 26 March 2021, at the 2021 British Athletics Marathon and 20km Walk Trial in Kew Gardens, Chris Thompson, Ben Connor, Stephanie Davis and Tom Bosworth confirmed qualification for Tokyo with a top two finish in their respective races, having already gained the qualification time. On 1 April 2021, Team GB announced the selection of these five athletes together with marathon runners Jess Piasecki and Steph Twell for Tokyo. On 4 June 2021, World Athletics confirmed that Cameron Corbishley and Dominic King had qualified by World Rankings for the Men's 50 km walk event. However, they have not met the qualification time requirements set out in British Athletics selection policy document and it remains to be seen whether they will be selected on the basis of future potential.

On 29 June 2021, Team GB announced the selection of a further 65 athletes following the completion of the British trials. The squad of 72 includes reigning world champions Dina Asher-Smith and Katarina Johnson-Thompson subject to the latter proving her fitness. On 2 July 2021, the final four athletes were confirmed by Team GB resulting in a 76 strong squad for Tokyo. Laura Muir later withdrew from the women's 800 m to concentrate on the 1500 m and her place was taken by Alexandra Bell increasing the final squad to 77.

Track & road events
Men

Women

Mixed

Field events
Men

Women

Combined events – Women's heptathlon

 Ran in the heats only.

Badminton

Great Britain entered badminton players for each of the following events into the Olympic tournament based on the BWF World Race to Tokyo Rankings of 15 June 2021: one entry each in the men's and women's singles and a pair in the men's, women's, and mixed doubles. On 28 June 2021, Team GB announced the squad of seven players who will represent the team in Tokyo. Ben Lane and Sean Vendy were selected to compete in the men's doubles even though Rio 2016 bronze medallists Marcus Ellis and Chris Langridge finished ahead of them in the rankings.

Boxing

Great Britain entered eleven boxers (seven men and four women) to compete for each of the following weight classes into the Olympic tournament. Rio 2016 Olympian and 2018 Commonwealth Games champion Galal Yafai (men's flyweight) and 2019 world bronze medallist Peter McGrail (men's featherweight) were the first boxers to secure their spots on the British squad by winning the round of 16 match of their respective weight divisions at the 2020 European Qualification Tournament in London. After being suspended due to the COVID-19 pandemic, the qualifying tournament resumed in Villebon-sur-Yvette, France. Nine further boxers secured places in their respective weight divisions, including Rio 2016 Olympian Pat McCormack in the men's welterweight.  The final total of eleven qualified boxers is the joint highest (with Uzbekistan and the ROC) of any nation at the 2020 Summer Olympics. On 23 June 2021, Team GB announced the names of the eleven boxers who would represent the team in Tokyo – each place went to the boxer who had obtained the quota place in qualification.

Men

Women

Canoeing

Slalom
British canoeists qualified boats in all four classes for the Games through the 2019 ICF Canoe Slalom World Championships in La Seu d'Urgell, Spain. On 10 October 2019, Team GB announced the names of the slalom canoeists selected for the Games, as a result of their performances at three selection meets: the British Senior and Olympic Trials, the 2019 ICF World Cup series in Lee Valley Park, and the World Championships.

Sprint
Great Britain qualified a single boat in the men's K-1 200 m with a gold-medal victory at the 2019 ICF Canoe Sprint World Championships in Szeged, Hungary. On 10 October 2019, reigning Olympic champion Liam Heath headed the list of canoeists being selected for the Games. Following the re-allocation of quota places gained at the World Championships and in subsequent competitions, Great Britain secured a place in the women's K-1 500 m. On 30 June 2021, Team GB announced the selection of the remaining members of their sprint canoe squad for Tokyo. On 8 July 2021, it was confirmed that Team GB had been reallocated a quota in the women's C-1 200 m and that Katie Reid would join the British canoe sprint squad in Tokyo.

Qualification Legend: FA = Qualify to final (medal); FB = Qualify to final B (non-medal)

Cycling

On 21 June 2021, Team GB announced the selection of their cycling squad for Tokyo. Notable inclusions were multiple gold medallists Geraint Thomas, Ed Clancy, and Jason and Laura Kenny. For the fourth Olympics in a row, Great Britain topped the medal table in cycling.

Road
Great Britain entered a squad of six riders (four men and two women) to compete in their respective Olympic road races, by virtue of their respective positions in the UCI World Ranking for nations as at 22 October 2019. Included were three Grand Tour winners, Geraint Thomas (2018 Tour de France), Simon Yates (2018 Vuelta a Espana) and Tao Geoghegan Hart (2020 Giro d'Italia). Former World Champion and London 2012 silver medallist Lizzie Deignan highlighted the women's team.

Women

James Knox and Joscelin Lowden were named as travelling reserves.

Track
Following the completion of the 2020 UCI Track Cycling World Championships, British riders accumulated spots in men's team sprint, men's and women's team pursuit, and men's and women's madison, as well as both the men's and women's omnium. As a result of their place in the men's team sprint, Great Britain won the right to enter two riders in both men's sprint and men's keirin.

Unable to earn a quota place in the women's team sprint, Great Britain won a single quota place in the women's individual sprint through the UCI Olympic rankings. Qualification for the individual sprint means a quota place is also gained in the women's keirin.

Great Britain's most successful male and female Olympians, Jason and Laura Kenny return, along with Ed Clancy. Both Jason Kenny (team sprint) and Clancy (team pursuit) are seeking to set a record for consecutive victories (four) in a single Olympic cycling event. Jason Kenny will also be seeking to gain the outright records for gold medals for a British Olympian, which he currently shares with Chris Hoy and most medals for any Olympic cyclist, currently held by Bradley Wiggins. Laura Kenny will seek to increase her lead as the British female Olympian with the most gold medals, and surpass Charlotte Dujardin as Britain's most decorated female Olympian, and Leontien Van Moorsel from the Netherlands as the most successful and most decorated Olympic female cyclist.

Sprint

Team sprint
With silver in the team sprint, Jason Kenny became Great Britain's outright most successful Olympian, cycling's most successful Olympian and the joint most decorated British and cycling Olympian with Bradley Wiggins.

Qualification legend: FA=Gold medal final; FB=Bronze medal final
* Philip Hindes travels as reserve.

Pursuit

* Charlie Tanfield originally travelled as a reserve. Following the qualification ride of the men's team pursuit, Ed Clancy withdrew from the men's team, citing a back injury, and announced his immediate retirement. As a consequence, Tanfield was called into the main squad and rode the heat and placing final. In the former, he suffered a crash when clipped from behind by the Denmark team. 

Keirin

Omnium

Madison

Mountain biking
Great Britain entered single mountain bikers to compete in both the men's and women's cross-country races. The men's quota was gained by finishing in the top two eligible nations of the under-23 division at the 2019 UCI Mountain Bike World Championships in Mont-Sainte-Anne, Canada. The women's quota was secured by virtue of their position in the UCI World Ranking for nations as at 16 May 2021.

Tom Pidcock's preparations for the men's event were disrupted when he broke his collarbone after being hit by a car during training in May 2021. However, he recovered to be able to compete in the Games where we won Britain's first ever Olympic mountain biking medal, winning gold by a margin of 20 seconds over second placed Mathias Flückiger of Switzerland.

BMX
Great Britain received two quota spots (one per gender) for BMX racing at the Olympics. The men's place was secured as a result of the nation's seventh-place finish in the UCI Olympic Ranking List of 1 June 2021, while the women's was derived from Bethany Shriever's individual ranking.

In BMX freestyle, two places (one per gender) were awarded to the British squad at the Olympics; both were secured as a result of the nation's top-five finish in the UCI Olympic Ranking List of 8 June 2021.

Race

* Ross Cullen travels as reserve.

Freestyle

Diving

British divers gained a full quota of 16 places for the following individual spots and synchronized teams at the Games through the 2019 FINA World Championships, the 2019 European Championships and the 2021 FINA Diving World Cup. The divers who secured the places for Great Britain were not necessarily the athletes who would be selected to represent their team in these events. Instead, they needed to compete at the Olympic trials to book their places for the Games. A team of 12 divers was announced on 2 June 2021, including defending champions Jack Laugher and Daniel Goodfellow in the men's synchronized springboard; and two-time world champion and multiple Olympic medallist Tom Daley. James Heatly, Katherine Torrance and Matty Lee make Olympic debuts, having all won gold in the inaugural European Games in 2015 as juniors with the returning Lois Toulson, while Grace Reid will do so as a reigning Commonwealth Games champion. European bronze and silver medallist Andrea Spendolini-Sirieix, the youngest of the squad, debuts at 16 years old.

Laugher, Daley, Reid and Touslon will double up in individual and synchronised events, with their quota places released to be filled by next-in-line alternates.

Men

Women

Equestrian

British equestrians qualified a full squad in the team dressage, eventing, and jumping competitions by virtue of a top-six finish at the 2018 FEI World Equestrian Games in Tryon, North Carolina, United States in dressage and eventing, and a top-three finish among eligible nations in the jumping competition at the 2019 FEI European Championships in Rotterdam, Netherlands.

On 1 July 2021, Team GB announced the selection of their dressage and eventing teams for Tokyo. Included in the dressage team were triple gold medallist Charlotte Dujardin and Carl Hester who will be competing at his sixth Olympic Games. The following day Team GB revealed the names of the three riders who will compete in the jumping events in Tokyo. The team included London 2012 gold medallists Scott Brash and Ben Maher.

In the team dressage the British team of Dujardin, Hester and Charlotte Fry finished in the bronze medal position. This was Dujardin's fifth Olympic medal, tying her with rower Katherine Grainger and tennis player Kathleen McKane Godfree as the female British athletes with the most Olympic medals. The following day in the individual dressage Dujardin, who was the two-time defending Olympic champion in the event, took another bronze medal, making her the first female British athlete to win six Olympic medals.

Dressage

Travelling reserve: Gareth Hughes (Sintano Van Hof Olympia)

Qualification Legend: Q = Qualified for the final; q = Qualified for the final as a lucky loser

Eventing

Travelling reserve: Rosalind Canter (Allstar B)

Jumping

* Harry Charles was the travelling reserve and he was called on to substitute for Holly Smith in the individual event and for Scott Brash in the team competition following an injury to the latter's horse, Hello Jefferson.

Fencing

Great Britain entered one fencer into the Olympic competition. 2019 world silver medallist Marcus Mepstead claimed a spot in the men's foil as one of the two highest-ranked fencers vying for qualification from Europe in the FIE Adjusted Official Rankings.

Field hockey

Summary

Men's tournament

Great Britain men's national field hockey team qualified for the Olympics by securing one of the seven team quotas available from the 2019 Men's FIH Olympic Qualifiers, defeating Malaysia 9–3 on aggregate in a two-match playoff in London.

Squad

Travelling reserves: Alan Forsyth and Harry Martin

Group play

Quarterfinal

Women's tournament

Great Britain women's national field hockey team qualified for the Olympics by securing one of the seven team quotas available from the 2019 Women's FIH Olympic Qualifiers, defeating Chile 5–1 on aggregate in a two-match playoff in London. On 17 June, Great Britain Hockey announced the selection of the squad that would represent the team in Tokyo.

Squad

Group play

Quarterfinal

Semifinal

Bronze medal game

Football

Summary

Women's tournament

The FIFA Women's World Cup serves as the UEFA qualifying competition for the Olympic football tournament, with the top three sides qualifying. On 27 June 2019, England reached the semi-finals of the 2019 FIFA Women's World Cup; the following day, the United States were confirmed as their opponents. This made England one of the top three European sides in the competition, which, under an agreement between the FA and the other three home nations and FIFA, allowed Great Britain to take up the qualifying place for the 2020 Olympics won by England.

Squad

Group play

Quarter-finals

Golf

Great Britain entered a total of two male and two female golfers into the Olympic tournament. Tyrrell Hatton and Paul Casey qualified directly among the top 60 eligible players for the men's event. However, Hatton announced his withdrawal on 21 June 2021 due to the COVID-19 pandemic and he was replaced by Tommy Fleetwood. Mel Reid and Jodi Ewart Shadoff qualified in a similar manner through the women's rankings. The latter following the withdrawal of higher-ranked British golfers Charley Hull and Georgia Hall. On 6 July 2021, Team GB confirmed the selection of the four golfers who will represent the team in Tokyo.

Gymnastics

Artistic
Great Britain fielded a full squad of four gymnasts in the women's artistic gymnastics events by finishing fourth out of the nations eligible for qualification in the team all-around qualification round at the 2019 World Artistic Gymnastics Championships in Stuttgart, Germany. The top nine eligible nations were awarded qualification places. The men's artistic gymnastics team also secured a place after finishing second among the nations eligible for qualification in the team all-around qualification round at the same championships. Again, nine team berths were available at this competition in total. On 24 May 2021, Team GB announced the selection of the four members of the men's squad including reigning individual pommel horse and floor exercise champion Max Whitlock together with three debutants. In June 2021, Team GB announced the selection of the four members of the women's team; all of them will make their Olympic debuts, including the twin sisters Jennifer and Jessica Gadirova.

Men
Team

Individual 

Women
Team

Individual

* Originally first reserve, Jennifer Gadirova was promoted to the floor final following the withdrawal of Simone Biles.

Trampoline
Great Britain qualified one gymnast for the women's trampoline by finishing in the top eight at the 2019 World Championships in Tokyo, Japan. Great Britain secured a second quota when Rio silver medallist Bryony Page finished fourth in the 2020/21 Trampoline World Cup series. On 10 June 2021, Page and Laura Gallagher were selected to fill these quotas in Tokyo.

Judo

Great Britain, at the conclusion of the 2021 World Judo championships, had achieved quota places in the following weight categories. Nekoda Smythe-Davis had qualified a continental quota place in the −57 kg category, but had already withdrawn from Olympic consideration for health reasons. On 5 July 2021, Team GB announced the judokas who will compete in Tokyo, including debutant Sarah Adlington in the women's heavyweight category, who had been awarded a continental quota following the official withdrawal of Smythe-Davis.

Modern pentathlon

British athletes qualified for the following spots in the modern pentathlon at the Games. Rio 2016 Olympian Joe Choong secured an outright berth in the men's event by winning the gold medal at the 2019 UIPM World Cup Final in Tokyo, Japan, becoming the first athlete to be named to Team GB for Tokyo 2020. World champion Jamie Cooke and fellow Briton Kate French confirmed places in their respective events with a podium finish (gold for Cooke and silver for French) at the 2019 European Championships in Bath. Following the conclusion of the 2021 UIPM Worlds, a second and final women's quota place was confirmed based on the world rankings. On 24 June 2021, Team GB announced the names of the four modern pentathletes chosen to compete in Tokyo.

Rowing

Great Britain qualified ten out of fourteen boats for each of the following rowing classes into the Olympic regatta, with all of the crews confirming Olympic places for their boats at the 2019 FISA World Championships in Ottensheim, Austria. On 9 June 2021, Team GB announced the names of the 41 rowers who would represent them in Tokyo. Notable rowers in the squad included double Olympic champion Helen Glover and two-time medallist Moe Sbihi. In addition, four travelling reserves were named: Morgan Bolding, Matthew Tarrant, Madeleine Arlett and Saskia Budgett.

Men

Women

Qualification Legend: FA=Final A (medal); FB=Final B (non-medal); FC=Final C (non-medal); FD=Final D (non-medal); FE=Final E (non-medal); FF=Final F (non-medal); SA/B=Semifinals A/B; SC/D=Semifinals C/D; SE/F=Semifinals E/F; QF=Quarterfinals; R=Repechage

Rugby sevens

In international competition the constituent nations of Great Britain ordinarily compete as separate unions representing England, Scotland and Wales. Northern Irish players who normally represent Ireland would have been eligible however the IRFU insisted that they do not play for Great Britain.

For the purposes of qualification for the 2020 Olympics the three British unions agreed in advance of the 2017–18 men's and women's Sevens World Series that their highest-finishing teams in that season would represent all three unions in the first stage of qualification during the 2018–19 series. The England men's and women's teams earned the right to represent the British unions in that stage of their respective competitions, but failed to qualify for the Olympic events through a top four finish.

As a result, England took part in the Rugby Europe Olympic qualification events for both men and women.

Summary

Men's tournament

The England men's team secured a qualifying berth for Great Britain at the Olympics by winning the 2019 Rugby Europe Sevens Olympic Qualifying Tournament, defeating France in the final. The British Olympic Association will select a team of twelve from the three home nations to represent Great Britain at the Games.

Squad

Group play

Quarterfinal

Semifinal

Bronze medal match

Women's tournament

The England women's team secured a qualifying berth for Great Britain at the Olympics by winning the 2019 Rugby Europe Women's Sevens Olympic Qualifying Tournament, defeating Russia in the final. The British Olympic Association will select a team of twelve from the three home nations to represent Great Britain at the Games.

Squad

Group play

Quarterfinal

Semifinal

Bronze medal match

Sailing

British sailors qualified boats in all Olympic classes at the 2018 Sailing World Championships, bringing the maximum quota of 15 sailors, in ten boats. On 1 October 2019, Team GB announced the names of the first twelve sailors selected for the Tokyo 2020 regatta, including Saskia Tidey, who previously competed for Ireland in Rio 2016, defending champions Giles Scott (Finn) and Hannah Mills (women's 470), and London 2012 silver medallists Luke Patience (men's 470) and Stuart Bithell (49er). The Nacra 17 crew (Gimson & Burnet) was added to the list of confirmed athletes for Tokyo on 24 January 2020. Laser sailor Elliot Hanson completed Team GB's sailing lineup for the Olympics on 29 February 2020.

Men

Women

Mixed

M = Medal race; DSQ = Disqualification; EL = Eliminated – did not advance into the medal race; UFD = "U" Flag disqualification

Shooting

British shooters achieved quota places for the following events by virtue of their best finishes at the 2018 ISSF World Championships, the 2019 ISSF World Cup series, European Championships or Games, and European Qualifying Tournament, as long as they obtained a minimum qualifying score (MQS) by 31 May 2020. On 13 January 2021, Team GB announced the selection of four athletes to fill the quotas secured by the team to date. Amber Hill secured a quota in the women's skeet after finishing at the top of the qualifying rankings for that event by winning the ISSF World Cup in New Delhi on 21 March 2021. On 27 May 2021, Hill secured a quota for Team GB by winning the bronze medal at the 2021 European Shooting Championships in Osijek, Croatia, superseding the earlier quota she had won and releasing it to a shooter from another NOC. On 15 June 2021, Team GB confirmed that Hill had been selected for Tokyo. On 21 July, the British Olympic Association confirmed that Hill, having failed a COVID-19 test before flying to Tokyo, had been forced to withdraw from the Games.

Matthew Coward-Holley, won Britain's only shooting medal of the Games, a  bronze in the men's trap. The reigning European and World champion, who had twice broken his back playing rugby as a teenager, missed his first three targets but then hit 14 in a row to secure the bronze medal.

Skateboarding

Great Britain entered two skateboarders to compete across all events at the Games. Sky Brown and Bombette Martin qualified among the top 16 eligible skateboarders in the women's park, respectively, based on the World Skate Olympic Rankings of 30 June 2021. On 1 July 2021, Team GB announced the selection of both athletes to represent the team in Tokyo.

Sport climbing

Great Britain entered one sport climber into the Olympic tournament. Shauna Coxsey qualified directly for the women's combined event, by advancing to the final stage and securing one of the seven provisional berths at the 2019 IFSC World Championships in Hachioji, Japan. On 11 February 2020, Team GB confirmed Coxsey's selection for Tokyo.

Swimming

British swimmers must qualify by finishing in the top two of the Olympic trials, gaining the GB qualifying A standard set by British Swimming in the relevant final (that time being the fastest time of the sixteenth fastest swimmer internationally in that event in 2019). The standard is typically well in advance of the qualification time set by the international federation FINA; therefore, the number and identity of swimmers who will represent Great Britain will not be known until the period concludes. British Swimming have set a maximum of 35 swimmers for the team, although one swimmer may swim in multiple events.

All selected British swimmers must further achieve the qualifying standards in the events (up to a maximum of 2 swimmers in each event at the Olympic Qualifying Time (OQT), and potentially 1 at the Olympic Selection Time (OST)):

Great Britain may also enter a team for relay events with a top 12 finish at the 2019 FINA World Championships, or having one of the four best times of a team outside that top 12 in a relay event. At the 2019 Championships, Great Britain secured 5 top 12 finishes out of 7 relay events, including the full set of male and mixed relay events, thus confirming Great Britain's first guaranteed places in the pool for Tokyo 2020.

On 20 January 2021, British Swimming announced that following a change of selection policy to deal with the COVID-19 pandemic, four male swimmers who won individual medals at the 2019 World Aquatics Championships would be pre-selected for their respective events, including the current Olympic champion and world record holder Adam Peaty in the men's 100 m breaststroke.

On 17 April 2021, Team GB and British Swimming announced a further 24 swimmers would join the team, consisting of all the swimmers who had met the Olympic Consideration Time in any event at the National Trials, plus two further swimmers who had met the consideration time in the men's 200 metre freestyle, and were thus considered for the men's 4 × 200 metre freestyle relay squad. Following the 2021 European Aquatics Championships. and Glasgow Open Swimming Meet, two further swimmers, Lucy Hope and Laura Stephens, were added to the final squad of thirty. Due to possible scheduling conflicts, Great Britain returned a quota place in the Women's  freestyle relay, which was then reallocated to Brazil.

In June 2021, Hector Pardoe and Alice Dearing won quotas in the men's and women's 10 km marathon by virtue of finishing first and fourth respectively in the final qualifying event in Setúbal, Portugal. On 25 June, Team GB confirmed their selection for Tokyo. Dearing becomes the first black female swimmer to compete for Team GB at the Olympics.

During the competition Adam Peaty won Team GB's first gold medal of the Games and became the first British swimmer to successfully defend an Olympic title, winning the men's 100 m breaststroke. In the men's 200 m freestyle Tom Dean won the gold medal with teammate Duncan Scott taking silver, the first time since 1908 that two male British swimmers had won medals in the same event. Dean then won a second gold medal, alongside Scott, James Guy and Matt Richards as Great Britain won the  4 × 200 m freestyle relay.

Men

Women

Mixed

 Swimmers who participated in the heats only.

Table tennis

Great Britain entered three athletes into the table tennis competition at the Games. Two-time Olympian Liam Pitchford and double Commonwealth Games medallist Tin-Tin Ho were automatically selected among the top ten table tennis players vying for qualification in their respective singles events based on the ITTF Olympic Rankings of 1 June 2021. Ho becomes the first British female table tennis player to compete at the Games since 1996. On 7 July 2021, Paul Drinkhall was granted a reallocated quota for the men's singles.

Taekwondo

Great Britain will enter a squad of five athletes into the taekwondo competition for the first time at the Games. Two-time defending Olympic champion Jade Jones (women's 57 kg), 2019 world champions Bradly Sinden (men's 68 kg) and Bianca Walkden (women's +67 kg), and former European and world junior champion Lauren Williams (women's 67 kg) qualified directly for their respective weight classes by finishing among the top five taekwondo practitioners in the WT Olympic Rankings at the end of the qualification period. With the 2019 World Taekwondo Grand Slam winner already qualified through the rankings, 2019 world silver medallist and Grand Slam Series runner-up Mahama Cho (men's +80 kg) secured a fifth and final spot for Great Britain, as the next highest-placed eligible taekwondo practitioner. As Great Britain have achieved two quota places or more in each sex, they will not be eligible for any further places through remaining continental or global qualification routes. On 1 June 2021, Team GB confirmed the selection of the five athletes who had secured qualification for Tokyo.

Tennis

On 24 June 2021, Team GB announced the selection of the six players who will represent the team in Tokyo. The most notable selection was that of defending singles champion and double gold medallist Andy Murray. In addition to these players Cameron Norrie also qualified through the rankings but declined the opportunity to attend the Games due to other professional commitments, while Kyle Edmund was recovering from surgery. Mixed doubles pairings are decided on rankings only when all players have been chosen, but Team GB are expected to be able to select a mixed doubles pair based on rankings.

On 13 July, Johanna Konta was forced to withdraw from the squad as a result of being diagnosed with SARS‑CoV‑2. This left Heather Watson as the only female player in the squad, and meant that, in the absence of a potential replacement (no British woman being ranked high enough to qualify), there would be no entry in the Women's Doubles tournament. On 14 July, Dan Evans withdrew from both men's singles and men's doubles due to a positive COVID-19 test. The following day it was announced that Jamie Murray would replace Evans as Neal Skupski's partner in the men's doubles. After further withdrawals from the men's singles event Liam Broady secured a place in the tournament based on his world ranking. On 25 July, Andy Murray withdrew from the men's singles due to a thigh strain and was replaced in the draw by Australian Max Purcell; Murray decided to continue his participation in the doubles.

Triathlon

Great Britain confirmed five quota places in the triathlon events for Tokyo. British Triathlon announced the athletes to occupy four of those places on 4 November 2020, including returning medallists Jonathan Brownlee and Vicky Holland. Reigning double Olympic champion Alistair Brownlee was not confirmed in the fifth and final quota place, which remains to be filled. On 14 June 2021, Team GB announced that Alex Yee had been selected to fill the remaining place on the British triathlon squad for Tokyo.

Individual

Relay

Weightlifting

Four female weightlifters qualified for Great Britain, one in each of the following weight classes. Former Commonwealth Games champion Zoe Smith (women's 59 kg), European medallist Sarah Davies (women's 64 kg), and European champion Emily Campbell (women's +87 kg) secured one of the top eight slots each in their respective weight divisions based on the IWF Absolute World Rankings. On 30 June 2021, Team GB confirmed their selection for Tokyo. On 4 July 2021, Colombia confirmed they would cede the women's −76 kg quota place as part of an agreement with the IWF following multiple doping violations, thus granting Emily Muskett, European champion in the non-Olympic −71 kg category, a quota place in the event. Muskett's place on the Olympic team was confirmed by Team GB on 6 July 2021.

Sports not contested by Great Britain in Tokyo

Basketball

Neither the men's nor the women's team qualified for the full court tournaments. The men's team were eliminated in the early stages, failing to emerge from their first-round group in qualification for the FIBA Basketball World Cup. The women's team fared much better, after a groundbreaking run to a fourth-place finish in the Women's EuroBasket tournament meant that they made the final qualification tournament in Belgrade. The team narrowly missed out on qualification at that tournament, largely due to a tight loss to South Korea, with whom they were vying for the third of three qualification places behind Spain and China.

Neither the men's nor women's 3x3 teams qualified.

Baseball

Great Britain failed to emerge from the 2019 European Baseball Championship to reach the final qualification tournament, finishing ninth.

Handball

Great Britain's 10th-place finish at the 2017 IHF Emerging Nations Championship ended their participation in qualification for the men's Olympic tournament. Great Britain did not enter a team in qualification for the women's Olympic event.

Karate

At the conclusion of the Final Karate Olympic Qualification Tournament, Great Britain had failed to advance any karateka to the Olympic Karate tournament.

Softball

Great Britain lost to Italy in the final of the combined Africa/Europe continental qualifying tournament so narrowly missing out on a place in Tokyo.

Surfing

Great Britain failed to qualify any surfers for the Games.

Volleyball

Team GB had no qualified teams in either full court or beach volleyball.

Water polo

Team GB did not qualify.

Wrestling

Great Britain did not qualify any athletes.

See also
Great Britain at the Olympics
Great Britain at the 2020 Summer Paralympics

References

External links 

 Team GB official website

Nations at the 2020 Summer Olympics
2020
2021 in British sport
Impact of the COVID-19 pandemic on the 2020 Summer Olympics